"Magneto" is the debut single from the UK rock band, Brigade, off their debut album Lights. It reached #3 on the UK Rock Chart and #134 on the UK Singles Chart.

Track listing
"Magneto"
"AM to Try"
"Versus You There Is No Contest"
"Magneto"
"Twenty One"

2006 singles
Brigade (band) songs
2006 songs